Scotsburn is a locality in Victoria, Australia. Its local government areas are the Shire of Moorabool and the City of Ballarat.

History
Located at the foot of Mount Buninyong, it was named after the Scott family which settled in the area around 1840. The Scotts had received £2,070 9S 2D as compensation for emancipated slaves in Tobago from the British West Indies, "under the will of Thos. Bird". Thomas Bird appears to have been Celia Scott's grandfather, and his inheritance was split between her and her two sisters.

After a period of growing potatoes in 1841-42 during poor financial times, in 1843 the Scott family began to run sheep. The Scott family also purchased property in the western district of Victoria and in New South Wales, with some members of the family moving to run sheep on the new stations. Over time various sections of the original farm were sold to new farmers in the district.

In 1876 the first school was opened, known for a short time as Burnt Hill State School (State School number 2176). Four years later the school was renamed Scotts Marsh and in 1889 it was again renamed, this time to Scotsburn. The school is now an annexe of Buninyong Primary School.

The post office opened on 9 August 1880 as Scott's Marsh, was renamed Scotsburn in 1889 and closed in 1971.

In 1884 the Scotsburn Union Church was formed, with an acre of land donated by Andrew Scott. The same church structure remains and still holds regular services.

In 1891 the Scotsburn Hall was built, funded by donations and land donated by the Eason family. Since its establishment it has been utilised by the local primary school, the Scotsburn Tennis Club, and local residents for various functions.

Recent history
A bushfire with an extent of 4600 hectares burned through Scotsburn and surrounding areas on 19 and 20 December 2015, killing livestock and pets and destroying at least twelve houses. Relief centres were set up for all evacuated people.

References

Scotsburn, The Early Settlers, 1838 - 1988

Towns in Victoria (Australia)